King of the Zombies is a 1941 American zombie comedy film directed by Jean Yarbrough and starring Dick Purcell, Joan Woodbury, and Mantan Moreland. The film was produced by Monogram Pictures, and was typical of its B films produced by the Pine-Thomas team. Along with flying scenes, the use of zany characters and slapstick efforts were juxtaposed with a spy and zombie story.

Plot
In 1941, a Capelis XC-12 transport aircraft flown by pilot James "Mac" McCarthy (Dick Purcell) flying between Cuba and Puerto Rico runs low on fuel and is blown off course by a storm. McCarthy, unable to pick up any radio transmissions over the Caribbean, hears a faint radio signal. After crash-landing on a remote island, his passenger Bill Summers (John Archer) and his black manservant/valet, Jefferson Jackson (Mantan Moreland) take refuge in a mansion owned by Dr. Miklos Sangre (Henry Victor) and his wife Alyce (Patricia Stacey).

The quick-witted yet easily frightened manservant soon becomes convinced the mansion is haunted by zombies and confirms this with some of Dr. Sangre's hired helps. With the assistance of Barbara Winslow (Joan Woodbury), the stranded group begins to find out what mysterious events are taking place in the mansion.

Whilst exploring, the group stumbles upon a voodoo ritual in the cellar. It is being conducted by the doctor, who is in reality a foreign spy, trying to acquire war intelligence from a captured US Admiral whose aircraft had also crashed on the island. McCarthy comes under the doctor's spell but Summers comes to his aid. Information is being transmitted to Barbara, but Summers stops the ritual. The interruption causes the zombies to turn on their master. Sangre shoots the pilot but falls into a firepit and dies. With Sangre dead, all the zombies are released from his spell.

Cast

 Dick Purcell as James "Mac" McCarthy
 Joan Woodbury as Barbara Winslow
 Mantan Moreland as Jefferson "Jeff" Jackson
 Henry Victor as Dr. Miklos Sangre
 John Archer as Bill Summers
 Patricia Stacey as Alyce Sangre
 Guy Usher as Admiral Arthur Wainwright
 Marguerite Whitten as Samantha, the Maid
 Leigh Whipper as Momba, the Butler
 Madame Sul-Te-Wan as Tahama, the Cook and High Priestess
 James Davis (credited as Jimmy) as Lazarus, a Zombie
 Laurence Criner as Dr. Couillie

Production

King of the Zombies was announced in January 1941 as a vehicle for Bela Lugosi. It was inspired by the success of The Ghost Breakers (1940).

Lugosi was meant to play the role of Dr. Sangre. When he became unavailable, negotiations ensued to obtain Peter Lorre for the part, but a deal could not be reached. Veteran character actor Henry Victor was signed just prior to the date of filming.

Principal photography by Sterling Productions, Inc. began on March 28, 1941 and wrapped in early April, being primarily filmed on a studio back lot. The transport aircraft used in King of the Zombies was a Capelis XC-12, built in 1933 by Capelis Safety Airplane Corporation of California. The aircraft was a 12-seat, low-wing cabin monoplane with two 525 hp Wright Cyclone engines.

Release
In the press kit for King of the Zombies, Monogram advised exhibitors to sell "it along the same lines as Paramount's The Ghost Breakers (1940)." The Bob Hope horror/comedy was a runaway hit at the time.

Reception
Writing in The Zombie Movie Encyclopedia, academic Peter Dendle called King of the Zombies "... utterly absurd and delightful".  Bruce G. Hallenbeck, who wrote Comedy-Horror Films, said that the film's politically incorrect humor comes off as innocent due to Moreland's delivery.

Awards
King of the Zombies was nominated for an Academy Award for Best Music (Music Score of a Dramatic Picture) (Edward Kay).

Sequel
Two years later, King of the Zombies was followed by a sequel, of sorts, called Revenge of the Zombies (1943) that included two of the original cast members. Mantan Moreland reprised his role as Jeff. Madame Sul-Te-Wan was cast as Mammy Beulah, the housekeeper.

References

Notes

Citations

Bibliography

 Dendle, Peter. The Zombie Movie Encyclopedia. Jefferson, North Carolina: McFarland & Company, 2001. .
 Hallenbeck, Bruce G. Comedy-Horror Films: A Chronological History, 1914-2008. Jefferson, North Carolina: McFarland & Company, 2009. .
 Weaver, Tom. Poverty Row Horrors! Mongram, PRC and Republic Horror Films of the Forties. Jefferson, North Carolina: McFarland & Company, 1993. .

External links

 
 
 
 
Review of film at And You Call Yourself a Scientist!

1941 films
1941 horror films
1940s comedy horror films
American black-and-white films
American comedy horror films
American zombie comedy films
1940s English-language films
Films about Voodoo
Films directed by Jean Yarbrough
Films produced by Lindsley Parsons
Films set in country houses
Films set in the Caribbean
Films set on islands
Monogram Pictures films
Mad scientist films
Nazi zombie films
1941 comedy films
1940s American films